Rochdale by-election may refer to one of three by-elections held for the British House of Commons constituency of Rochdale in Lancashire:

1940 Rochdale by-election, an unopposed war-time election
1958 Rochdale by-election, the first televised election in the UK
1972 Rochdale by-election

See also
 Rochdale
 List of United Kingdom by-elections